The 2001–02 Macedonian Second Football League was the tenth season since its establishment. It began in August 2001 and ended on 29 May 2002.

Participating teams

League standing

See also
2001–02 Macedonian Football Cup
2001–02 Macedonian First Football League

References

External links
Football Federation of Macedonia 
MacedonianFootball.com 

Macedonia 2
2
Macedonian Second Football League seasons